The 1982 Copa Libertadores de América Finals was the final two-legged tie to determine the champion of the 1982 edition. It was contested by Uruguayan club Peñarol and Chilean club Cobreloa. The first leg of the tie was played on 26 November at Estadio Centenario (used by Peñarol as its home venue by then) with the second leg played on 30 November at Estadio Nacional in Santiago.

Peñarol won the series by 1-0 on aggregate, achieving their 4th. Copa Libertadores title.

Format
The finals were played over two legs; home and away. The team that accumulates the most points —two for a win, one for a draw, zero for a loss— after the two legs would be crowned the champion. If the two teams were tied on points after the second leg, a playoff in a neutral venue would become the next tie-breaker. Goal difference was going to be used as a last resort.

Qualified teams

Venues

Match details

First leg

Second leg

References

C
1982
C
C